Cyclostrema bushi is a species of sea snail, a marine gastropod mollusk in the family Liotiidae.

This species was named after the American malacologist Katherine J. Bush (1855–1937) who had made a revision of Cyclostrema in 1897 (Transactions of the Connecticut Academy of Science 10: 97–144).

Description

Distribution
This marine species occurs off Madagascar.

References

bushi
Gastropods described in 1906